Sailaufbach is a small river of Bavaria, Germany. It flows into the Laufach near Hösbach.

See also
List of rivers of Bavaria

Rivers of Bavaria
Rivers of Germany